Masked Singer Suomi is a Finnish reality singing competition television series based on the Masked Singer franchise which originated from the South Korean version of the show King of Mask Singer. It premiered on MTV3 on 14 March 2020, and is hosted by Ilkka Uusivuori and the panelists are Janne Kataja, Jenni Kokander and Maria Veitola.

The inaugural season premiered in March 2020 and was successful with roughly a million viewers per episode. Season 2 started on 17 October 2020, with new panelist Christoffer Strandberg joining in.

The third season was announced in June 2021, with 16 contestants, while Uusivuori hosting and Kataja, Veitola, Kokander and Strandberg serve as panelists.

Cast
The series has been hosted by Ilkka Uusivuori all way from Season 1. The Regular panelists have been Janne Kataja, Jenni Kokander and Maria Veitola from Season 1 as well.

In Season 1, there was a changing Guest panelist in each episode. These appearances were made by Tuure Boelius, Krista Siegfrids, Aki Linnanahde, Eicca Toppinen, Christoffer Strandberg, and many others.

From Season 2, Christoffer Strandberg was replacing the Guest panelists.

Series overview

Season 1 (Spring 2020)
The first season of Masked Singer Suomi was aired on spring 2020. Ilkka Uusivuori served as the host, while Janne Kataja, Jenni Kokander and Maria Veitola were panelists. The guest panelists were (in episode order) Tuure Boelius, Aki Linnanahde, Joonas Nordman, Jufo Peltomaa, Krista Siegfrids, Mikko Kuustonen, Benjamin Peltonen, Eini, Jannika B and Eicca Toppinen.

Sami Hedberg won the Season as “Lion”, while Ilkka Alanko, “Haystack” finished as second.

Season 2 (Autumn 2020)
The second season of Masked Singer Suomi was aired on late autumn 2020, and was hosted by Ilkka Uusivuori. Janne Kataja, Jenni Kokander and Maria Veitola continued as panelists, while Christoffer Strandberg joined them.

Marko Hietala won the Season as “Doctor”, while Jarkko Tamminen finished as second with Masked Singer “Mouse”.

Season 3 (2021)
The third season of Masked Singer Suomi was aired on late summer 2021, and was hosted by Ilkka Uusivuori. Janne Kataja, Jenni Kokander, Maria Veitola and Christoffer Strandberg continued as panelists.

Anna-Maija Tuokko won the Season as "Superhero", while Waltteri Torikka finished second as "Party Panda".

Season 4 (2022)
The fourth season of Masked Singer Suomi was aired on fall 2022, and was hosted by Ilkka Uusivuori. Janne Kataja, Jenni Kokander, Maria Veitola and Christoffer Strandberg continued as panelists.

Lenni-Kalle Taipale won the Season as "Black Sheep", while Tuure Boelius finished second as "Orc".

Season 1

Episodes

Week 1 (14 March)

Week 2 (21 March)

Week 3 (28 March)

Week 4 (4 April)

Week 5 (11 April)

Week 6 (18 April)

Week 7 (24 April)

Week 8 (2 May)

Week 9 (9 May)

Week 10 (16 May) 
Group performance: "Don't Stop the Music" by Rihanna

Season 2

Episodes

Week 1 (17 October)

Week 2 (24 October)

Week 3 (31 October)

Week 4 (7 November)

Week 5 (14 November)

Week 6 (21 November)

Week 7 (28 November)

Week 8 (12 December1) 

1 There were aired no episodes in the first week of December, due other local programming at the same time. The eighth episode of Season 2 was postponed to the following week.

Week 9 (18 & 19 December) 

 Group performance: "Peto On Irti" by Antti Tuisku

Season 3

Episodes

Week 1 (28 August)

Week 2 (4 September)

Week 3 (11 September)

Week 4 (18 September)

Week 5 (25 September)

Week 6 (2 October)

Week 7 (9 October)

Week 8 (16 October)

Week 9 (23 October)

Week 10 (30 October)
 Guest Performance: "Kanoottilaulu" by Sielun Veljet performed by Mika Tommola as "Monster."

Week 11 (6 November)

Week 12 (13 November)

Week 13 (20 November)

 Group performance: "I Love You" By Teflon Brothers & Pandora

Season 4

Episodes

Week 1 (3 September)

Week 2 (10 September)

Week 3 (17 September)

Week 4 (24 September)

Week 5 (1 October)

Week 6 (8 October)

Week 7 (15 October)

Week 8 (22 October)

Week 9 (29 October)

Week 10 (5 November)

Week 11 (12 November)

Week 12 (19 November)
 Group performance: "Bad Romance" by Lady Gaga

References

External links
 
 

2020 Finnish television series debuts
2020s Finnish television series
Finnish-language television shows
Finnish television series based on South Korean television series
Masked Singer
MTV3 original programming
Finnish non-fiction television series